The Malaysian federal budget for 2016 fiscal year was presented to the Dewan Rakyat by Prime Minister and Minister of Finance, Najib Razak on Friday, 23 October 2015.

Summary
Official sources (Malay version)

Official sources (English version)

Total revenues and spending

Revenues

Official sources

(In million MYR)

Expenditures by object
Official sources

These tables are in million MYR.

Expenditures by budget function
Official sources

These tables are in million MYR. The budget for the 2016 fiscal year (also demonstrating the basic budget structure) can be found below.

Reactions
 Maria Chin Abdullah - The Bersih chairperson urged all opposition MPs to vote down the government's 2016 budget to oust Prime Minister Najib Razak.
 Pandikar Amin Mulia - The Speaker of the Dewan Rakyat said the opposition should submit a list of MPs willing to support a motion of no confidence against the Prime Minister to establish if the move had enough traction for a debate. Pandikar also said the list would give him leverage to pressure Putrajaya to agree to having the motion tabled and debated, especially if the numbers go beyond the 89 seats occupied by the opposition. 
 Shahrir Abdul Samad - The Barisan Nasional Backbenchers Club (BNBBC) chairman said if the budget, to be tabled by Najib, failed to be passed in the Dewan Rakyat, the prime minister would automatically have to relinquish his post. "If the budget is not passed, there is no government, no finances. How will the government carry out its administration without paying salaries and allocations?", Shahrir said.

See also
 2016 Pakatan Harapan alternative federal budget

References

External links
 #Bajet2016 - HOME
 2016 Budget | Prime Minister's Office of Malaysia
 Laporan Ekonomi 2015/2016
Jawatan Kosong

Malaysian budgets
13th Parliament of Malaysia
2015 in Malaysian politics
Malaysian federal
2015 in Malaysian law